

Christian Wirth (born in the 1970s), better known by the pseudonym RaD Man, is an American computer artist and historian.  He works in the field of ANSI art, a method of creating art using a limited set of text characters and color escape codes based loosely on the relevant ANSI standard (X3.64: Control Sequences for Video Terminals and Peripherals).

RaD Man was initially involved with the Aces of ANSI Art (AAA), an organization which created ANSI artwork for a number of computer bulletin board systems from 1989 to 1991.  With others, he created the "ANSI Creators in Demand" group (also known as ACiD).

Starting in 1990, ACiD released artwork on an ad hoc network of BBSes, updating a collection of art known as the ACiD Acquisition by sending a compressed file of all the completed work up to that time.  By 1992, the increasing file size made this process impractical, and this led to the development of the artpack, where groups of artists (including ACiD) would upload monthly update packages instead.  In early 2004, RaD Man directed and produced ACiD Acquisition Update #100, colloquially known as "ACiD-100, the final artpack released by ACiD as a group.

In 1996, RaD Man founded the ACiD Artpacks Archive to collect the artpacks created by the hundreds of groups that followed in ACiD's footsteps.  This collection eventually was transferred to DVD as Dark Domain: the artpacks.acid.org collection in 2004.

Since 2002, RaD Man has worked as a historian and spokesperson for the artscene, collecting information and interviews with the artists involved, and creating reports and presentations on the lineage of computer art.  Some of this work includes The ARTS, a talk radio show which discusses the many different facets of the creative computer underground scenes  and the Pilgrimage 2004 demoparty.

In 2006, RaD Man became a member of cDc's Ninja Strike Force.

In 2007, he co-founded Blockparty with Jason Scott, a North American demoparty.  The event was produced in cooperation with Notacon and took place annually in Cleveland, Ohio, from 2007–2010.

In November 2009, ANSI art group Blocktronics paid tribute to RaD Man and his contributions to the ANSI art scene by releasing an artpack titled "Codename Chris Wirth".

External links

Interviews
 1992 - RaD Man interviews Ian Davis, author of TheDraw ANSI editor
 1992 - NOT! magazine interview with RaD Man
 1994 - Corruption magazine interview with RaD Man
 1994 - Distorted magazine interview with RaD Man
 1995 - Jonas magazine interview with RaD Man
 1996 - Beyond the Horizon interview with RaD Man
 1997 - Acrylic magazine interview with RaD Man (reprint) .ANS version (original)
 1998 - Woezine magazine interview with RaD Man
 1999 - Acheron.org interview with RaD Man
 2002 - Interview with RaD Man for the independent documentary film, BBS: The Documentary
 2003 - iCE.org interview with RaD Man
 2004 - Tsifra magazine interview with RaD Man (translated in both English and Russian)
 2004 - 3dluvr.com interview with RaD Man and Legalize concerning Pilgrimage 2004 and the state of the scene
 2007 - Hugi Magazine interview with RaD Man and Jason Scott concerning Blockparty 2007

Speeches
 2004 - "The Art of Textmode" at Assembly 2004, August 5, 2004 - August 8, 2004
 2004 - Jason Scott and RaD Man (ACiD) - 100 Years of the Computer Art Scene Presented at Notacon 1,  April, 2004
 2005 - Steering an Art Collective at Notacon
 2005 - Beyond ASCII the Art of Textmode at the DeviantArt Summit
 2007 - T506 - Self Publishing in the Underground at DefCon 15, August 4, 2007

Miscellaneous
 
 Official page on DeviantArt

References

1970s births
Artscene
Living people
Artists from California